The first season of the American television sitcom Rules of Engagement premiered on February 5, 2007 and concluded on March 19, 2007. It consists of 7 episodes, each running approximately 22 minutes in length. CBS broadcast the first season on Mondays at 9:30 pm in the United States.

Cast

Main cast
 Patrick Warburton as Jeff Bingham
 Megyn Price as Audrey Bingham
 Oliver Hudson as Adam Rhodes
 Bianca Kajlich as Jennifer Morgan
 David Spade as Russell Dunbar

Episodes

Ratings

References

2007 American television seasons